Lakurgan (also Romanized as Lākūrgān; also known as Lākūrgān Va Nokhvodkār) is a village in Susan-e Sharqi Rural District, Susan District, Izeh County, Khuzestan Province, Iran. At the 2006 census, its population was 37, in 6 families.

References 

Populated places in Izeh County